The  is a national expressway in Japan. It is owned and managed by East Nippon Expressway Company.

Naming

Officially, the Kan-Etsu consists of two routes. Both begin in Tokyo and end in Niigata Prefecture. The Kan-Etsu Expressway Niigata Route consists of the entire Kan-Etsu Expressway from Nerima to Nagaoka, as well as the Hokuriku Expressway beyond Nagaoka to its terminus in the city of Niigata. The Kan-Etsu Expressway Jōetsu Route is concurrent with the Niigata Route until Fujioka Junction, where it branches off as the Jōshin-etsu Expressway and traverses Nagano Prefecture to its terminus in Jōetsu, Niigata.

Route description

The expressway begins in Nerima Ward in the north of Tokyo; the Kan-etsu is the only national expressway linking Tokyo that does not have a direct connection with the urban Shuto Expressway network. A junction with the Tokyo Gaikan Expressway near the origin links the Kan-etsu with other expressways serving northern parts of the Tokyo urban area. From here the expressway follows a roughly northwesterly course to its terminus in Niigata Prefecture, passing through central areas of Saitama Prefecture and Gunma Prefecture. In Gunma the Kan-etsu Expressway provides access to Nagano Prefecture by way of the Jōshin-etsu Expressway at Fujioka Junction, and the completion of the Kita-Kantō Expressway in 2011 facilitated access to Tochigi Prefecture and Ibaraki Prefecture. The mountainous area separating Gunma and Niigata Prefectures is traversed by the Kan-Etsu Tunnel, the second longest road tunnel in Japan. The expressway then passes through southern Niigata Prefecture before terminating at a junction with the Hokuriku Expressway in Nagaoka. The route is six lanes from Ōizumi Junction to Shibukawa-Ikaho Interchange, and all other sections are four lanes. The expressway parallels National Route 17 and the Jōetsu Shinkansen of East Japan Railway Company for most of its length.

History
The first section opened in 1971 and the entire route was opened to traffic in 1985. On the night of 16 December 2020, about 1,000 vehicles were trapped on the expressway after a trailer blocked it off due to it becoming stuck in the snow. In response, the company that manages the route supplied drivers who were stuck on the road until the next morning. The Japan Ground Self-Defense Force was also deployed to the expressway to aid in the distribution of supplies to the stranded drivers.

List of interchanges and features

 IC - interchange, SIC - smart interchange, JCT - junction, SA - service area, PA - parking area, TB - toll gate, BS - bus stop, CB - snow chains, TN - tunnel, BR - bridge

References

External links

 East Nippon Expressway Company 

Expressways in Japan
Roads in Gunma Prefecture
Roads in Niigata Prefecture
Roads in Saitama Prefecture
Roads in Tokyo